The Circle Ranch, also known as the R.L. Miller Ranch has been continuously operated as a working cattle ranch for more than 100 years. Located in Sublette County, Wyoming, it was first occupied as a homestead by Otto Liefer between 1878 and 1880. Liefer sold his claim to James Mickelson in 1895, who developed the ranch into one of the largest ranching operations in the area. The ranch has remained in the Mickelson family ever since.

The cottonwood log Liefer cabin remains standing, along with a cabin built about the same time by Nicolas Swan. Together, they are the oldest permanent structures standing in Sublette County. The early cabins are surrounded by ranch buildings built by the Mickelson-Miller family, including a 1905 ranch house.

The Circle Ranch was placed on the National Register of Historic Places in 1987.

References

External links
 Circle Ranch at the Wyoming State Historic Preservation Office

Buildings and structures in Sublette County, Wyoming
Ranches in Wyoming
Ranches on the National Register of Historic Places in Wyoming
Historic districts on the National Register of Historic Places in Wyoming
National Register of Historic Places in Sublette County, Wyoming